Yong Hock Kin (born 14 June 1976) is a former badminton player from Malaysia.

Achievements

Asian Games 
Men's singles

Commonwealth Games 
Men's singles

IBF World Grand Prix 
The World Badminton Grand Prix sanctioned by International Badminton Federation (IBF) from 1983 to 2006.

Men's singles

References

1974 births
Living people
People from Negeri Sembilan
Malaysian sportspeople of Chinese descent
Malaysian male badminton players
Badminton players at the 1998 Asian Games
Asian Games bronze medalists for Malaysia
Asian Games medalists in badminton
Medalists at the 1998 Asian Games
Badminton players at the 1998 Commonwealth Games
Commonwealth Games gold medallists for Malaysia
Commonwealth Games silver medallists for Malaysia
Commonwealth Games medallists in badminton
Competitors at the 1997 Southeast Asian Games
Southeast Asian Games silver medalists for Malaysia
Southeast Asian Games medalists in badminton
Medallists at the 1998 Commonwealth Games